Hydrelia nisaria is a moth in the family Geometridae first described by Hugo Theodor Christoph in 1881. It is found in the Russian Far East, China, Japan and Korea.

The wingspan is 13–16 mm.

The larvae have been recorded feeding on Acer ginnala.

References

Moths described in 1881
Asthenini
Moths of Asia